PRCC can refer to:
 Puerto Rico Convention Center
 PRCC (gene)